Mu Coronae Australis (Mu CrA), Latinized from μ Coronae Australis, is a solitary yellow-hued star located in the southern constellation Corona Australis. It has an apparent magnitude of 5.22, making it faintly visible to the naked eye. At its current distance, Mu CrA's brightness is diminished by 0.31 magnitudes due to interstellar dust. It has an absolute magnitude of −0.22.

Mu CrA has a stellar classification of G5/6 III, indicating that it is an evolved G-type star with the characteristics of a G5 and G6 giant star. At an age of 365 million years, the  star has exhausted the supply of hydrogen at its core and has expanded to 11.4 times the radius of the Sun.

References 

G-type giants
Corona Australis
Corona Australis, Mu
Durchmusterung objects
173540
092226
7050